Annia Galeria Faustina the Younger (born probably 21 September  AD, – 175/176 AD) was Roman empress from 161 to her death as the wife of Emperor Marcus Aurelius, her maternal cousin. Faustina was the youngest child of Emperor Antoninus Pius and Empress Faustina the Elder. She was held in high esteem by soldiers and her husband as Augusta and Mater Castrorum ('Mother of the Camp') and was given divine honours after her death.

Life

Early life 

Faustina, named after her mother, was her parents' fourth and youngest child and second daughter; she was also their only child to survive to adulthood. She was born and raised in Rome.

Her second cousin three times removed, emperor Hadrian, had arranged with her father for Faustina to marry Lucius Verus. On 25 February 138, she and Verus were betrothed. Verus' father was Hadrian's first adopted son and his intended heir; however, when Verus' father died, Hadrian chose Faustina's father to be his second adopted son, and eventually, he became Hadrian's successor. Faustina's father ended the engagement between his daughter and Verus and arranged for Faustina's betrothal to her maternal cousin, Marcus Aurelius; Aurelius was also adopted by her father.

Imperial heiress 

In April or May 145, Faustina and Marcus Aurelius were married, as had been planned since 138. Since Aurelius was, by adoption, Antoninus Pius' son, under Roman law he was marrying his sister; Antoninus would have had to formally release one or the other from his paternal authority (his patria potestas) for the ceremony to take place. Little is specifically known of the ceremony, but it is said to have been "noteworthy". Coins were issued with the heads of the couple, and Antoninus, as Pontifex Maximus, would have officiated. Marcus makes no apparent reference to the marriage in his surviving letters, and only sparing references to Faustina. Faustina was given the title of Augusta on 1 December 147 after the birth of her first child, Domitia Faustina.

Empress 
When Antoninus died on 7 March 161, Marcus and Lucius Verus ascended to the throne and became co-rulers. Faustina then became empress. Following the birth of her first child in 147, Faustina obtained the title of Augusta granted to her by the Senate, before her husband Marcus Aurelius became Augustus himself in 161.

Not much has survived from the Roman sources regarding Faustina's life, but what is available does not give a good report. Cassius Dio and the unreliable Historia Augusta accuse Faustina of ordering deaths by poison and execution; she has also been accused of instigating the revolt of Avidius Cassius against her husband. The Historia Augusta mentions adultery with sailors, gladiators, and men of rank; however, Faustina and Aurelius seem to have been very close and mutually devoted.

Faustina accompanied her husband on various military campaigns and enjoyed the excessive love and reverence of Roman soldiers. Aurelius gave her the title of Mater Castrorum or ‘Mother of the Camp’. She attempted to make her home out of an army camp. Between 170 and 175, she was in the north, and in 175, she accompanied Aurelius to the east.

Revolt of Avidius Cassius and death 
That same year, 175, Aurelius's general Avidius Cassius was proclaimed Roman emperor after the erroneous news of Marcus's death; the sources indicate Cassius was encouraged by Marcus' wife Faustina, who was concerned about her husband's failing health, believing him to be on the verge of death, and felt the need for Cassius to act as a protector in this event, since her son Commodus, aged 13, was still young. She also wanted someone who would act as a counter-weight to the claims of Tiberius Claudius Pompeianus, who was in a strong position to take the office of Princeps in the event of Marcus's death. The evidence, including Marcus's own Meditations, supports the idea that Marcus was indeed quite ill, but by the time Marcus recovered, Cassius was already fully acclaimed by the Egyptian legions of II Traiana Fortis and XXII Deiotariana.

"After a dream of empire lasting three months and six days", Cassius was murdered by a centurion; his head was sent to Marcus Aurelius, who refused to see it and ordered it buried. Egypt recognized Marcus as emperor again by 28 July 175.

The facts concerning the death of Faustina are not definite. She died in the winter of 175 at the military camp in Halala (a city in the Taurus Mountains in Cappadocia).  The causes of her death are of speculation of scholars and range from death from natural causes, suicide, an accident, or even possibly assassination in retaliation for her alleged affair with Cassius earlier that year, depending on the source. 

Aurelius grieved much for his wife and buried her in the Mausoleum of Hadrian in Rome. She was deified: her statue was placed in the Temple of Venus in Rome and a temple was dedicated to her in her honor. Halala's name was changed to Faustinopolis and Aurelius opened charity schools for orphan girls called Puellae Faustinianae or 'Girls of Faustina'. The Baths of Faustina in Miletus are named after her.

Children 

In their thirty years of marriage, Faustina and Marcus Aurelius had many children, at least 14 are known for certain. Only six survived to adulthood, five daughters and the son Commodus. Faustina’s role as a mother was glorified, and with the birth of her daughter, Fadilla, coins were issued, portraying her as Juno Lucina.

Domitia Faustina (born 147, died around 155)
Titus Aelius Antoninus (149–149), twin of the one below
Titus Aelius Aurelius (149–149), twin of the one above
Annia Aurelia Galeria Lucilla (150–182), married her father's co-ruler Lucius Verus
Gemellus Lucillus (150 – died around 150), twin brother of Lucilla
Aurelia (151–151)
Tiberius Aelius Antoninus (born 152 – died before 161)
Hadrianus (152–157)
Annia Aurelia Galeria Faustina (153 – after 165)
Aurelius (157–158)
Annia Aurelia Fadilla (159 – after 211)
Annia Cornificia Faustina Minor (160 – after 211)
Titus Aurelius Fulvus Antoninus (161–165), twin brother of emperor Commodus
Lucius Aurelius Commodus Antoninus (161–192), Roman emperor
Marcus Annius Verus Caesar (162–169)
Vibia Aurelia Sabina (170 – died before 217)

References

Citations

Bibliography

 

 
 
 
 Scriptores Historiae Augustae (nominally Julius Capitolinus), Marcus Antoninus xix.1–9, xxvi.4–5, 7–9, xxix.1–3

External links

 

 

 

130s births
175 deaths
Nerva–Antonine dynasty
Annii
Burials at the Castel Sant'Angelo
2nd-century Roman empresses
Deified Roman empresses
Marcus Aurelius

Ancient Roman women in warfare
Augustae
Daughters of Roman emperors